Leptodrymus is a genus of snake in the family Colubridae that contains the sole species Leptodrymus pulcherrimus. It is known as the  striped lowland snake or green-headed racer.

It is found throughout Central America, in Costa Rica, Guatemala, Nicaragua, El Salvador and Honduras.

References 

Colubrids
Monotypic snake genera
Reptiles described in 1874
Reptiles of Costa Rica
Reptiles of Guatemala
Reptiles of Nicaragua
Reptiles of Honduras
Reptiles of El Salvador
Taxobox binomials not recognized by IUCN